A Society for the Prevention of Cruelty to Animals (SPCA) is a common name for non-profit animal welfare organizations around the world. The oldest SPCA organization is the RSPCA, which was founded in England in 1824. SPCA organizations operate independently of each other and campaign for animal welfare, assist in the prevention of cruelty to animals cases.

SPCA organizations by continent

Africa

 Botswana — Botswana Society For The Prevention Of Cruelty To Animals (BSPCA)
 Egypt — General/Cairo SPCA
 Branches all over Egypt, Cairo SPCA is the oldest association in Africa and the Middle East, established in 1895. 
 Kenya — Kenya Society for the Protection and Care of Animals (KSPCA)
 Namibia — Tierschutzverein (SPCA) Swakopmund
South Africa
National Council of SPCAs (NSPCA)
Cape Town — Cape of Good Hope Society for the Prevention of Cruelty to Animals
Zimbabwe — Zimbabwe Society for the Prevention of Cruelty to Animals

Asia

Lahore, Pakistan — Society for Prevention of Cruelty to Animals
Philippines — Philippine Society for the Prevention of Cruelty to Animals
Singapore — Singapore Society for the Prevention of Cruelty to Animals
Hong Kong — Society for the Prevention of Cruelty to Animals (Hong Kong)
Taiwan (ROC) — Taiwan Society for the Prevention of Cruelty to Animals www.spca.org.tw
 Iran — Iran Society for the Prevention of Cruelty to Animals (Tehran, Iran) www.iranspca.com
 Bahrain — Bahrain Society for the Prevention of Cruelty to Animals (Askar, Bahrain) www.bspca.org/
Thailand — Thai Society for the Prevention of Cruelty to Animals
Kathmandu, Nepal — Society for the Prevention of Cruelty to Animals Nepal

India 

 Dehradun — Society for Prevention of Cruelty to Animals
 Chennai — Madras society for prevention of cruelty to animals
 Cuttack — State society for the prevention of cruelty to animals Odisha
 Kolkata — Calcutta Society for The Prevention of Cruelty to Animals
 Kollam — Society for the Prevention of Cruelty to Animals
 Lucknow — Society for Prevention of Cruelty to Animals
 Mumbai — Bombay Society for Prevention of Cruelty to Animals
 Noida — Society for Prevention of Cruelty to Animals
 Punjab — Society for the Prevention of Cruelty to Animals
 Thane — Thane S.P.C.A
 Visakhapatnam — Visakha Society for the Prevention of Cruelty to Animals
 Jamshedpur — Society for the prevention of cruelty to Animals
 Bihar -Society for Prevention of Cruelty to Animals Avinash Singh

Malaysia 

Selangor — Society for the Prevention of Cruelty to Animals, Selangor, Malaysia
Kota Kinabalu, Sabah — Society for the Prevention of Cruelty to Animals, Kota Kinabalu, Sabah, Malaysia
Kuching — Sarawak Society for the Prevention of Cruelty to Animals, Kuching, Sarawak, Borneo, Malaysia
Lahad Datu — Society for the Prevention of Cruelty to Animals, Lahad Datu, Sabah, Malaysia

Israel
The Society for Prevention of Cruelty to Animals, Tel Aviv-Yafo
The Society for Prevention of Cruelty to Animals, Jerusalem
The Society for Prevention of Cruelty to Animals, Ramat Gan
The Society for Prevention of Cruelty to Animals, Haifa
The Society for Prevention of Cruelty to Animals, Rehovot
The Society for Prevention of Cruelty to Animals, Be'er Sheva

Europe
France — Société Protectrice des Animaux (SPA)
Italy — SPCA ITALIA Protezione Animali 
Norway — SPCA Norge 
Romania — Romanian Society for the Prevention of Cruelty to Animals (RSPCA)
The Netherlands — Dierenbescherming

Ireland 

 Irish Society for Prevention of Cruelty to Animals (ISPCA)
 Dublin Society for Prevention of Cruelty to Animals (DSPCA)

Malta 

 MSPCA
Gozo — Gozo SPCA

Poland 

Society for the Prevention of Cruelty to Animals
 Straż dla Zwierząt

United Kingdom
England and Wales — Royal Society for the Prevention of Cruelty to Animals 
Scotland — Scottish Society for the Prevention of Cruelty to Animals 
Northern Ireland — Ulster Society for the Prevention of Cruelty to Animals
Jersey — Jersey Society for the Prevention of Cruelty to Animals
Guernsey - Guernsey Society for the Prevention of Cruelty to Animals

North America

Canada
Canada — Canadian Federation of Humane Societies
Ontario — Ontario Society for the Prevention of Cruelty to Animals
British Columbia — British Columbia Society for the Prevention of Cruelty to Animals
Alberta — Alberta Society for the Prevention of Cruelty to Animals
Nova Scotia — Nova Scotia Society for the Prevention of Cruelty
Montreal, Quebec — Société Canadienne Pour La Prévention De La Cruauté Envers Les Animaux / Canadian Society for the Prevention of Cruelty to Animals (Montreal)
Saskatchewan — Saskatchewan Society for the Prevention of Cruelty to Animals

United States
In the United States, all organizations using the name SPCA are independent; there is no umbrella organization. Some of the more notable organizations include:

 American Society for the Prevention of Cruelty to Animals
Houston, Texas — Houston Society for the Prevention of Cruelty to Animals – one of the original featured SPCA's on the Animal Planet Network show Animal Cops: Houston
Maryland — Maryland Society for the Prevention of Cruelty to Animals
Massachusetts — Massachusetts Society for the Prevention of Cruelty to Animals
New Jersey — New Jersey Society for the Prevention of Cruelty to Animals
Pennsylvania — Pennsylvania Society for the Prevention of Cruelty to Animals
Roanoke Valley, Virginia — Roanoke Valley Society for the Prevention of Cruelty to Animals
Oregon — Oregon Humane Society - largest SPCA on the West Coast
Rhode Island — Rhode Island Society for the Prevention of Cruelty to Animals

California 

Los Angeles — Society for the Prevention of Cruelty to Animals Los Angeles
Monterey County — Society for the Prevention of Cruelty to Animals, Monterey County, California
San Francisco —San Francisco SPCA
Sacramento — Sacramento SPCA
Orange County — OC Animal Allies

Caribbean

Saint Vincent and the Grenadines — Vincentian Society for the Prevention of Cruelty to Animals - The VSPCA is independent and not associated with SPCA International.
Jamaica — Jamaica Society for the Prevention of Cruelty to Animals (J.S.P.C.A.)

Oceania
Australia — Royal Society for the Prevention of Cruelty to Animals Australia (RSPCA Australia)
New Zealand — Royal New Zealand Society for the Prevention of Cruelty to Animals
Papua New Guinea — Royal Society for the Prevention of Cruelty to Animals of Papua New Guinea

See also
 Cruelty to animals
 Animal rights
 Animal welfare
 List of animal welfare organizations

References

External links 

 Guide to the Animal Rights and Animal Welfare Pamphlets 1874-1952

1824 establishments in the United Kingdom
Animal charities
Animal welfare organizations